Tottika (circa 550-600 CE) was a king of the Tarim Basin state of Kucha in the second half of the 6th century CE. He  appears in a mural of the Maya Cave of the Kizil Caves, with his wife Svayamprabhā, accompanied by two monks and other attendants. The paintings were brought to Berlin by the Third Turfan expedition (1905-1907), but lost in World War II.

The murals of Maya Cave are generally thought to date to the 2nd half of the 6th century, after the 552 Turk conquest following their uprising against the Jou-Jan Qağanate.

References

Tocharians
Asian kings
6th-century monarchs in Asia
Central Asian people